The 1986 Rutgers Scarlet Knights football team represented Rutgers University in the 1986 NCAA Division I-A football season. In their third season under head coach Dick Anderson, the Scarlet Knights compiled a 5–5–1 record while competing as an independent and outscored their opponents 221 to 189. The team's statistical leaders included Scott Erney with 1,160 passing yards, Matt Prescott with 606 rushing yards, and Brian Cobb with 368s receiving yards.

Schedule

References

Rutgers
Rutgers Scarlet Knights football seasons
Rutgers Scarlet Knights football